The 1959–60 Sheffield Shield season was the 58th season of the Sheffield Shield, the domestic first-class cricket competition of Australia. New South Wales won the championship for the seventh consecutive year.

Table

Statistics

Most Runs
Bob Simpson 902

Most Wickets
Johnny Martin 45

References

Sheffield Shield
Sheffield Shield
Sheffield Shield seasons